Mallemuk Mountain is a mountain plateau with seaward cliffs in NE Greenland.  Administratively it is part of the Northeast Greenland National Park zone.

This mountain was named by the ill-fated Denmark expedition after the numerous colonies of northern fulmars breeding in the cliffs.

Geography
Mallemuk Mountain is located by the Dijmphna Sound in the southeastern shore of Holm Land, in the King Frederick VIII Land area of northeastern Greenland.

For former expeditions to remote NE Greenland Mallemuk Mountain was useful as a landmark for its conspicuous cliffs. Although the sea in the area is permanently covered by fast ice, off the feet of the cliffs there is often open water.

See also
List of mountains in Greenland
Polynya

References

External links
Carbon isotope variations in the Upper Carboniferous - Permian Mallemuk Mountain Group, eastern North Greenland
Picture - Tobias Gabrielsen og Aage Berthelsen ved Mallemukfjeldet - Digital collections

Mountains of Greenland